The 2010 Alamo Bowl may refer to:

 2010 Alamo Bowl (January), January 1, 2010 bowl game between Michigan State University and Texas Tech University
 2010 Alamo Bowl (December), December 29, 2010 bowl game between Oklahoma State and Arizona